Members of the Legislative Council of Northern Rhodesia from 1962 until 1964 were elected on 30 October 1962. However, not all the national seats were filled; although by-elections were held on 10 December, several seats still remained empty.

List of members

Upper Roll seats

Lower Roll seats

National seats

Nominated members

Replacements

Ex officio members

References

1962